Råde Station is a located on the Østfold Line railway, located at the village of Karlshus in Råde county, Norway. The station is served by regional trains between Oslo and Halden with hourly headway by Vy.

History
The station was opened in 1879 as part of the Østfold line.

External links
 

Railway stations in Østfold
Railway stations on the Østfold Line
Railway stations opened in 1879
1879 establishments in Norway
Råde